The Journal of Cuneiform Studies was founded in 1947 by the Baghdad School of the American Schools of Oriental Research. The journal presents articles about ancient Mesopotamian language and history in English, French and German.

External links
 titles of articles in back issues of the Journal of Cuneiform Studies

Cuneiform Studies
Cuneiform
Ancient Near East journals
Annual journals
Publications established in 1947
Multilingual journals